Personoid is the concept coined by Stanisław Lem, a Polish science-fiction writer, in Non Serviam, from his book A Perfect Vacuum (1971). His personoids are an abstraction of functions of human mind and they live in computers; they do not need any human-like physical body. 

In cognitive and software modeling, personoid is a research approach to the development of intelligent autonomous agents.
In frame of the IPK (Information, Preferences, Knowledge) architecture, it is a framework of abstract intelligent agent with a  cognitive and structural intelligence. It can be seen as an essence of high intelligent entities.

From the philosophical and systemics perspectives, personoid societies can also be seen as the carriers of a culture. According to N. Gessler, the personoids study can be a base for the research on artificial culture and culture evolution.

Personoids on TV and cinema
 Welt am Draht (1973)
 The Thirteenth Floor (1999)

See also
 Android
 Humanoid
 Intelligence
 Artificial Intelligence
 Culture
 Computer Science
 Cognitive Science
 Anticipatory science
 Memetics

References
 Stanisław Lem's book Próżnia Doskonała (1971). The collection of book reviews of nonexistent books. Translated into English by Michael Kandel as A Perfect Vacuum (1983).
 Personetics.
 Personoids Organizations Framework: An Approach to Highly Autonomous Software Architectures, ENEA Report (1998).
 Paradigms of Personoids, Adam M. Gadomski 1997.
 Computer Models of Cultural Evolution. Nicholas Gessler. In EVOLUTION IN THE COMPUTER AGE - Proceedings of the Center for the Study of Evolution and the Origin of Life, edited by David B. and Gary B. Fogel. Jones and Bartlett Publishers, Sudbury, Massachusetts (2002).
Hypothetical technology
Computing terminology
Computing in fiction
Scientific method
Artificial intelligence